"Heaven's Earth" is the fourth single from Delerium's album Karma featuring singer Kristy Thirsk. The original version was released as a bonus track on the second disc of the album.

After the huge success of the hit single Silence this song was also released with a trance remix by Matt Darey as the main radio version. Another remix was done by Key South.

No video was made for this single.

Track listing
 UK CD Single 1 - 2000
 "Heaven's Earth (Matt Darey Remix Edit)" - 3:59
 "Heaven's Earth (Key South Remix)" - 9:00
 "Heaven's Earth (Matt Darey Remix Dub)" - 6:22

 UK Cd Single 2 - 2000
 "Heaven's Earth (Matt Darey Remix)" - 8:18
 "Heaven's Earth (Key South Remix Edit)" - 3:38
 "Heaven's Earth (Album Version Edit)" - 3:56

 Canada Matt Darey Remix Vinyl - 2000
 "Heaven's Earth (Matt Darey Remix)" - 8:18
 "Heaven's Earth (Matt Darey Remix Dub)" - 8:15
 "Heaven's Earth (Matt Darey Remix Edit)" - 3:59

 European Remix Vinyl - 2000
 "Heaven's Earth (Matt Darey Remix)" - 8:18
 "Heaven's Earth (Key South Remix)" - 9:00

 Australian Cd Single - 2000
 "Heaven's Earth (Matt Darey Remix Edit)" - 3:59
 "Heaven's Earth (Key South Remix Edit)" - 3:38
 "Heaven's Earth (Original Mix Edit)" - 3:56
 "Heaven's Earth (Matt Darey Remix)" - 8:18
 "Heaven's Earth (Key South Remix)" - 9:00

Charts

References

Delerium songs
1997 songs
Songs written by Bill Leeb
Songs written by Rhys Fulber
Nettwerk Records singles